The Haußelberg is a hill,  above NN, in the Lüneburg Heath in the north German  district of Celle. It is a popular viewing point in the otherwise very flat terrain of the Südheide Nature Park. 

In 1820 George IV of the United Kingdom tasked the Professor of Astronomy and Director of the Observatory at Göttingen University, Carl Friedrich Gauss, to survey the Kingdom of Hanover. The mathematician Gauss used the summit of the Haußelberg as one of the triangulation stations for his land surveys, triangulating it to the Falkenberg,  AMSL, further west near Wardböhmen and to the Wilseder Berg,  AMSL, to the north. Another triangle was formed by the Haußelberg, the Falkenberg and Breithorn (Breitenhorn),  AMSL, south of Unterlüß. It has to be deduced that these points - the Breithorn, Haußelberg and Falkenberg - which are all hidden by woods today, were then on open, unforested hilltops, probably surrounded by heathland. Not until the large, systematic afforestation in the 2nd half of the 19th century did today's wooded hilltops emerge.

In 2005 a new trig point was erected on the Haußelberg, near the original stone.

Part of the triangulation network used for Gauss's survey was pictured on the reverse side of the 4th series of 10 Deutschmark banknotes.

Whilst he surveyed from the Haußelberg, Gauss lived for 10 days on the farm of von der Ohe in Oberohe (today in the municipality of Faßberg). In a letter to his friend Dr. Olbers he wrote:

References and footnotes 

Overview of the surveyed triangulation systems

Hills of Lower Saxony